The following units and commanders fought in the Battle of Northern and Eastern Henan  (January – June 1938).

Japan 

North China Area Army – Juichi Terauchi  

1st Army – Kiyoshi Katsuki
14th Division – Kenji Doihara
 27th Infantry Brigade				
 2nd Infantry Regiment
 59th Infantry Regiment				
 28th Infantry Brigade				
 15th Infantry Regiment
 50th Infantry Regiment
 20th Field Artillery Regiment			
 18th Cavalry Regiment				
 14th Engineer Regiment				
 14th Transport Regiment		
 108th Division – Kumaya Shimomoto
 25th Infantry Brigade
 117th Infantry Regiment
 132nd Infantry Regiment
 104th Infantry Brigade
 52nd Infantry Regiment
 105th Infantry Regiment
 108th Field Artillery Regiment
 108th Cavalry Regiment
 108th Engineer Regiment
 108th Transport Regiment
20th Division – ?
 39th Infantry Brigade
 77th Infantry Regiment
 78th Infantry Regiment
 40th Infantry Brigade
 79th Infantry Regiment
 80th Infantry Regiment
 26th Field Artillery Regiment
 28th Cavalry Regiment
 20th Engineer Regiment
 20th Transport Regiment
 109th Division – ?
 31st Infantry Brigade
 69th Infantry Regiment
 107th Infantry Regiment
 118th Infantry Brigade
 119th Infantry Regiment
 136th Infantry Regiment
 109th Mountain Artillery Regt
 109th Cavalry Regiment
 109th Engineer Regiment
 109th Transport Regiment
 Forces directly under 1st Army: **
 4th Independent Machinegun Battalion
 5th Independent Machinegun Battalion
 9th Independent Machinegun Battalion
 1st Independent Light Armored Car Squadron
 5th Independent Light Armored Car Squadron
 2nd Tank Battalion
 1st Independent Mountain Artillery Regiment
 3rd Independent Mountain Artillery Regiment
 2nd Field operation Heavy Artillery Regiment
 5th Field operation Heavy Artillery Regiment
 6th Field operation Heavy Artillery Regiment
 8th Independent Field Heavy Artillery Regiment
 3rd Artillery Battalion
 5th Artillery Battalion
2nd Army – Toshizō Nishio,  Field Marshal Prince Naruhiko Higashikuni (from 30 Apr 1938)
16th Division – Kesou Nakashima
 9th Infantry Brigade				
 9th Infantry Regiment				
 20th Infantry Regiment 				
 30th Infantry Brigade				
 33rd Infantry Regiment				
 38th Infantry Regiment				
 22nd Field Artillery Regiment			
 16th Engineer Regiment				
 16th Transport Regiment				
 5th Division  
 10th Division
 Directly under North China Front Army:
 114th Division – ?  (from Central China Front Army) 
 127th Infantry Brigade
 66th Infantry Regiment
 115th Infantry Regiment
 128th Infantry Brigade
 102nd Infantry Regiment
 150th Infantry Regiment
 120th Field Artillery Regt
 118th Cavalry Regiment
 114th Engineer Regiment
 114th Transport Regiment
 China Mixed Brigade – ? 
 1st China Stationed Infantry Regiment – Colonel Hasegawa
 2nd China Stationed Infantry Regiment – Colonel ?
 China Garrison Cavalry Unit
 China Garrison Artillery Regiment – Colonel ?
 China Stationed Engineer Unit
 China Stationed Signal Unit – ?
 3rd Independent Mixed Brigade – ?  
 6th Independent Infantry Battalion
 7th Independent Infantry Battalion
 8th Independent Infantry Battalion
 9th Independent Infantry Battalion
 10th Independent Infantry Battalion
 Independent Artillery Troops
 Independent labor troops
 Signal Communication unit.
 4th Independent Mixed Brigade – ? 
 11th Independent infantry Battalion
 12th Independent infantry Battalion
 13th Independent infantry Battalion
 14th Independent infantry Battalion
 15th Independent infantry Battalion
 Independent Artillery Troops
 Independent labor troops
 5th Independent Mixed Brigade – ?  
 16th Independent Infantry Battalion
 17th Independent Infantry Battalion
 18th Independent Infantry Battalion
 19th Independent Infantry Battalion
 20th Independent Infantry Battalion
 Independent artillery troops
 Independent labor troops

China 

China (Feb. 1938)

1st War Area – Cheng Qian
  Eastern Honan Army –  Hsueh Yueh
 64th Corps – Li Han-huen
 155th Division – Chen Kung-hsin
 187th Division – Peng Ling-cheng
 74th Corps – Wang Yao-wu
 51st Division – Wang Yao-wu
 58th Division – Po Hui-chang
 8th Corps – 	Huang Chieh
 40th Division – Lo Li-jung
 102nd Division – Po Hui-chang
 27th Corps – Kuei Yung-ching
 36th Division [g] – Chiang Fu-sheng
 46th Division – Li Liang-yung
 17th Army – Hu Tsung-nan
 1st Corps – Li Tieh-chun
 1st Division – Li Tieh-chun
 78th Division – Li Wen
 3rd Army Group – Sun Tongxuan
 12th Corps – Sun Tongxuan
 20th Division – Chang Tse-ming
 22nd Division – Ku Liang-min
 81st Division – Chan Shu-tang
 55th Corps – Tsao Fu-lin
 29th Division – Tsao Fu-lin
 74th Division – Li Han-chang
 20th Army – Shang Chen
 32nd Corps – Shang Chen
 139th Division – Li Chao-ying
 141st Division – Sung Ken-tang
 142nd Division – Lu Chi
 Salt Gabelle Brigade – Chian Chi-ke
 23rd Division – Li Pi-fan
 71st Corps – Sung Hsi-lien
 87th Division [g] – Shen Fa-tsao
 88th Division [g] – Fung Mu-han
 39th Corps –  Liu Ho-ting
 34th Division – Kung Ping-fan
 56th Division – Liu Shang-chih
 1st Army Group – Song Zheyuan
 77th Corps – Feng Chih-an
 37th Division – Chang Ling-yun
 132nd Division – Wang Chang-hai
 179th  Division – Ho Chi-feng
 69th Corps – Shih Yu-san
 181st Division – Shih Yu-san
 New 9th Division – Kao Shu-hsun
 53rd Corps – Wan Fu-lin
 116th  Division – Chao Fu-cheng
 130th  Division – Chu Hung-hsun
 91st Corps – Kao Tse-chu
 166th Division – Ma Li-wu
 45th Division – Liu Chin
 90th Corps – Peng Chin-chih
 195th Division – Liang Kai
 196th Division – Liu Chao-huan
 New 8th Division – Chiang Tsai-chen
 95th Division – Lo Chi
 91st Division – Feng Chan-tsai
 New 35th Division – Wang Ching-tsai
 61st  Division – Chung Sung
 106th  Division – Shen Ke
 109th  Division – Li Shu-sen
 94th  Division – Chu Huai-ping
 24th  Division – Lin Ying
 9th Reserve Division – Chang Yen-chuan
 8th  Reserve Division – Ling Chao-yao
 28th Separate Brigade – Wu Hua-wen
 Hopei Militia – Chang Yin-wu
 Hopei Chahar Guerrilla Commander – Sun Tien-ying
 3rd Cavalry Corps – Cheng Ta-chang
 4th Cavalry Division – Chang The-shun
 9th Cavalry Division – Wang Chi-feng
 14th Separate Cavalry Brigade – Chang Chan-kuei
 2nd Brigade, New 1st Cavalry Division – Ma Lu
 13th Cavalry Brigade – Yao Ching-chuan
 6th Artillery Brigade – Huang Yung-an
 10th Separate Artillery Brigade – Peng Meng-chi
 5th Regiment, 1st Arty Brigade – Li Kang-yen
 7th Separate Artillery Regiment – Chang Kuang-hou
 9th Separate Artillery Regiment – Kuang Yu-ai

Airforce
 3rd ARC had its headquarters at Sian and supported the 1st and 2nd War Zones in Honan and Hupei.  During March was the 7th Pursuit Squadron of the 3rd Pursuit Group was re-equipped with Polikarpov I-15bis fighters at Xiang Yung. At the same time the 8th Pursuit Squadron from the same group re-equipped with I-15bis at Sian. In Ziaogan, for the support of the ground forces in the battle for Taierzhuang and Zaozhuang (Hubei Province), the 7th and 8th PS was ordered to conclude the re-training on the I-15bis. In March the 17th and 25th PS with the I-15bis were concentrated to Sian (Shensi Province).

Notes
 [g] German trained Divisions:
3rd, 6th, 9th, 14th, 36th, 87th, 88th, and the Training Division of the Central Military Academy. Also the "Tax Police" regiment (equivalent of a division) under T.V. Soong's Ministry of Finance, later converted to the New 38th Division during the war. 
 [r]12 other Divisions on the reorganized model with 2  German advisors:
2nd,  4th, 10th, 11th, 25th, 27th, 57th, 67th, 80th, 83rd, 89th Division

References

Sources 
 Hsu Long-hsuen and Chang Ming-kai, History of The Sino-Japanese War (1937–1945) 2nd Ed.,1971. Translated by Wen Ha-hsiung, Chung Wu Publishing, pp. 230–235. Map 9-2
  Sino-Japanese Air War 1937–45: 1938
 History of the Frontal War Zone in the Sino-Japanese War, published by Nanjing University Press.
 Madej, W. Victor, Japanese Armed Forces Order of Battle, 1937–1945 [2 vols], Allentown, Pennsylvania: 1981.

Henan 1938
Henan 1938